Assadulayevo is a rural locality (a settlement) in Tatarobashmakovsky Selsoviet, Privolzhsky District, Astrakhan Oblast, Russia. The population was 843 as of 2010. There are 23 streets.

Geography 
Assadulayevo is located 34 km southwest of Nachalovo (the district's administrative centre) by road. Tatarskaya Bashmakovka is the nearest rural locality.

References 

Rural localities in Privolzhsky District, Astrakhan Oblast